This is a list of the main domestic association football competitions in Slovenia, most of which were established in 1991 by the Football Association of Slovenia.

League competitions
Slovenian PrvaLiga
The top tier division is contested annually by ten teams. The winners qualify for the UEFA Champions League, while the second and third-placed teams qualify for the UEFA Europa Conference League, along with the cup winner. The most successful team is Maribor with 16 titles as of 2022.

Slovenian Second League
The second-tier league, also known as the 2. SNL, is contested by sixteen teams. The winners are automatically promoted to the PrvaLiga and the two bottom-placed teams are relegated to the 3. SNL.

Slovenian Third League
The third level of Slovenian football, also known as the 3. SNL, comprises two regional leagues (East and West). This is the lowest level that is managed by the Football Association of Slovenia.

Slovenian Regional Leagues / Intercommunal Leagues
The fourth, fifth and sixth tier of the Slovenian football, run by the Intercommunal Football Associations of MNZ Celje, MNZ Nova Gorica, MNZ Koper, MNZG-Kranj, MNZ Lendava, MNZ Ljubljana, MNZ Maribor, MNZ Murska Sobota, and MNZ Ptuj.

Cup competitions
Slovenian Cup
The national cup of Slovenia is contested by 120 teams in the first round. The winners qualify for the following season's UEFA Europa Conference League. The most successful team is Maribor with nine trophies as of 2022.

Slovenian Supercup
The Supercup was a one-off annual match between the PrvaLiga champions and Slovenian Cup winners. Maribor is the most successful team with four Supercup titles. The competition was abolished after the 2015 edition.

Women's competitions
Slovenian Women's League
The top level women's league, contested by eight teams. The winners qualify for the UEFA Women's Champions League. The most successful clubs are Krka and Mura with nine titles each as of 2022.

Slovenian Women's Cup
Knock-out competition, contested by all women's clubs. The most successful club is Mura with nine trophies as of 2022.

See also

Football in Slovenia
Football Association of Slovenia

References
Football Association of Slovenia official website

External links
PrvaLiga official website 
Slovenian Cup at Rec.Sport.Soccer Statistics Foundation